This is a list of the mammal species recorded in Cameroon. There are 327 mammal species in Cameroon, of which four are critically endangered, sixteen are endangered, twenty-three are vulnerable, and fourteen are near threatened.

The following tags are used to highlight each species' conservation status as assessed by the International Union for Conservation of Nature:

Some species were assessed using an earlier set of criteria. Species assessed using this system have the following instead of near threatened and least concern categories:

Order: Afrosoricida (tenrecs and golden moles) 

The order Afrosoricida contains the golden moles of southern Africa and the tenrecs of Madagascar and Africa, two families of small mammals that were traditionally part of the order Insectivora.

Family: Tenrecidae (tenrecs)
Subfamily: Potamogalinae
Genus: Potamogale
 Giant otter shrew, P. velox 
Family: Chrysochloridae
Subfamily: Chrysochlorinae
Genus: Chrysochloris
 Stuhlmann's golden mole, Chrysochloris stuhlmanni LC
Subfamily: Amblysominae
Genus: Calcochloris
 Congo golden mole, Calcochloris leucorhinus DD

Order: Tubulidentata (aardvarks) 

The order Tubulidentata consists of a single species, the aardvark. Tubulidentata are characterised by their teeth which lack a pulp cavity and form thin tubes which are continuously worn down and replaced.

Family: Orycteropodidae
Genus: Orycteropus
 Aardvark, O. afer

Order: Hyracoidea (hyraxes) 

The hyraxes are any of four species of fairly small, thickset, herbivorous mammals in the order Hyracoidea. About the size of a domestic cat they are well-furred, with rounded bodies and a stumpy tail. They are native to Africa and the Middle East.

Family: Procaviidae (hyraxes)
Genus: Dendrohyrax
 Western tree hyrax, D. dorsalis 
Genus: Procavia
 Cape hyrax, P. capensis

Order: Proboscidea (elephants) 

The elephants comprise three living species and are the largest living land animals.
Family: Elephantidae (elephants)
Genus: Loxodonta
African bush elephant, L. africana 
African forest elephant, L. cyclotis

Order: Sirenia (manatees and dugongs) 

Sirenia is an order of fully aquatic, herbivorous mammals that inhabit rivers, estuaries, coastal marine waters, swamps, and marine wetlands. All four species are endangered.

Family: Trichechidae
Genus: Trichechus
 African manatee, Trichechus senegalensis VU

Order: Primates 

The order Primates contains humans and their closest relatives: lemurs, lorisoids, tarsiers, monkeys, and apes.

Suborder: Strepsirrhini
Infraorder: Lemuriformes
Superfamily: Lorisoidea
Family: Lorisidae
Genus: Arctocebus
 Golden angwantibo, Arctocebus aureus LR/nt
 Calabar angwantibo, Arctocebus calabarensis LR/nt
Genus: Perodicticus
 Potto, Perodicticus potto LR/lc
Family: GalagidaeGenus: Sciurocheirus Bioko Allen's bushbaby, Sciurocheirus alleni LR/nt
 Cross River bushbaby, Sciurocheirus cameronensis LR/lc
Genus: Galago Senegal bushbaby, Galago senegalensis LR/lc
Genus: Galagoides Prince Demidoff's bushbaby, Galagoides demidovii LR/lc
 Thomas's bushbaby, Galagoides thomasi LR/lc
Genus: Euoticus Southern needle-clawed bushbaby, Euoticus elegantulus LR/nt
 Northern needle-clawed bushbaby, Euoticus pallidus LR/nt
Suborder: Haplorhini
Infraorder: Simiiformes
Parvorder: Catarrhini
Superfamily: Cercopithecoidea
Family: Cercopithecidae (Old World monkeys)
Genus: Allenopithecus Allen's swamp monkey, Allenopithecus nigroviridis LR/nt
Genus: Miopithecus Gabon talapoin, Miopithecus ogouensis LR/lc
Genus: Erythrocebus Patas monkey, Erythrocebus patas LR/lc
Genus: Chlorocebus Tantalus monkey, Chlorocebus tantalus LR/lc
Genus: Cercopithecus Red-tailed monkey, Cercopithecus ascanius LR/lc
 Moustached guenon, Cercopithecus cephus LR/lc
 Red-eared guenon, Cercopithecus erythrotis VU
 Mona monkey, Cercopithecus mona LR/lc
 De Brazza's monkey, Cercopithecus neglectus LR/lc
 Greater spot-nosed monkey, Cercopithecus nictitans LR/lc
 Crowned guenon, Cercopithecus pogonias LR/lc
 Preuss's monkey, Cercopithecus preussi EN
Genus: Lophocebus Grey-cheeked mangabey, Lophocebus albigena LR/lc
Genus: Papio Olive baboon, Papio anubis LR/lc
Genus: Cercocebus Collared mangabey, Cercocebus torquatus LR/nt
Genus: Mandrillus Drill, Mandrillus leucophaeus EN
 Mandrill, Mandrillus sphinx VU
Subfamily: Colobinae
Genus: Colobus Mantled guereza, Colobus guereza LR/lc
 Black colobus, Colobus satanas VU
Genus: Procolobus Red colobus, Procolobus badius EN
 Pennant's colobus, Procolobus pennantii EN
Superfamily: Hominoidea
Family: Hominidae (great apes)
Subfamily: Homininae
Tribe: Gorillini
Genus: Gorilla Western gorilla, Gorilla gorilla EN
Tribe: Panini
Genus: Pan Common chimpanzee, Pan troglodytes EN

 Order: Rodentia (rodents) 

Rodents make up the largest order of mammals, with over 40% of mammalian species. They have two incisors in the upper and lower jaw which grow continually and must be kept short by gnawing. Most rodents are small though the capybara can weigh up to 45 kg (100 lb).

Suborder: Hystricognathi
Family: Bathyergidae
Genus: Cryptomys Nigerian mole-rat, Cryptomys foxi DD
Family: Hystricidae (Old World porcupines)
Genus: Atherurus African brush-tailed porcupine, Atherurus africanus LC
Genus: Hystrix Crested porcupine, Hystrix cristata LC
Family: Thryonomyidae (cane rats)
Genus: Thryonomys Lesser cane rat, Thryonomys gregorianus LC
 Greater cane rat, Thryonomys swinderianus LC
Suborder: Sciurognathi
Family: Anomaluridae
Subfamily: Anomalurinae
Genus: Anomalurus Lord Derby's scaly-tailed squirrel, Anomalurus derbianus LC
 Dwarf scaly-tailed squirrel, Anomalurus pusillus LC
Genus: Anomalurops Beecroft's scaly-tailed squirrel, Anomalurops beecrofti LC
Subfamily: Zenkerellinae
Genus: Idiurus Long-eared flying mouse, Idiurus macrotis LC
 Pygmy scaly-tailed flying squirrel, Idiurus zenkeri DD
Genus: Zenkerella Flightless scaly-tailed squirrel, Zenkerella insignis DD
Family: Sciuridae (squirrels)
Subfamily: Xerinae
Tribe: Xerini
Genus: Xerus Striped ground squirrel, Xerus erythropus LC
Tribe: Protoxerini
Genus: Epixerus Baifran palm squirrel, Epixerus wilsoni DD
Genus: Funisciurus Thomas's rope squirrel, Funisciurus anerythrus DD
 Lady Burton's rope squirrel, Funisciurus isabella LC
 Ribboned rope squirrel, Funisciurus lemniscatus DD
 Red-cheeked rope squirrel, Funisciurus leucogenys DD
 Fire-footed rope squirrel, Funisciurus pyrropus LC
Genus: Heliosciurus Red-legged sun squirrel, Heliosciurus rufobrachium LC
Genus: Myosciurus African pygmy squirrel, Myosciurus pumilio DD
Genus: Paraxerus Cooper's mountain squirrel, Paraxerus cooperi DD
 Green bush squirrel, Paraxerus poensis LC
Genus: Protoxerus Forest giant squirrel, Protoxerus stangeri LC
Family: Gliridae (dormice)
Subfamily: Graphiurinae
Genus: Graphiurus Christy's dormouse, Graphiurus christyi DD
 Jentink's dormouse, Graphiurus crassicaudatus DD
 Lorrain dormouse, Graphiurus lorraineus LC
 Nagtglas's African dormouse, Graphiurus nagtglasii LC
 Kellen's dormouse, Graphiurus kelleni DD
 Silent dormouse, Graphiurus surdus DD
Family: Nesomyidae
Subfamily: Dendromurinae
Genus: Dendromus Banana climbing mouse, Dendromus messorius LC
 Cameroon climbing mouse, Dendromus oreas VU
Genus: Prionomys Dollman's tree mouse, Prionomys batesi DD
Genus: Steatomys Fat mouse, Steatomys pratensis LC
Subfamily: Cricetomyinae
Genus: Cricetomys Emin's pouched rat, Cricetomys emini LC
Family: Muridae (mice, rats, voles, gerbils, hamsters, etc.)
Subfamily: Deomyinae
Genus: Acomys Johan's spiny mouse, Acomys johannis LC
Genus: Deomys Link rat, Deomys ferrugineus LC
Genus: Lophuromys Dieterlen's brush-furred mouse, Lophuromys dieterleni VU
 Fire-bellied brush-furred rat, Lophuromys nudicaudus LC
 Mount Cameroon brush-furred rat, Lophuromys roseveari LC
 Rusty-bellied brush-furred rat, Lophuromys sikapusi LC
Genus: Uranomys Rudd's mouse, Uranomys ruddi LC
Subfamily: Otomyinae
Genus: Otomys Burton's vlei rat, Otomys burtoni VU
 Western vlei rat, Otomys occidentalis VU
Subfamily: Gerbillinae
Genus: Desmodilliscus Pouched gerbil, Desmodilliscus braueri LC
Genus: Tatera Kemp's gerbil, Tatera kempi LC
 Fringe-tailed gerbil, Tatera robusta LC
Genus: Taterillus Congo gerbil, Taterillus congicus LC
 Gracile tateril, Taterillus gracilis LC
 Lake Chad gerbil, Taterillus lacustris LC
Subfamily: Murinae
Genus: Aethomys Hinde's rock rat, Aethomys hindei LC
 Tinfields rock rat, Aethomys stannarius NT
Genus: Arvicanthis Guinean grass rat, Arvicanthis rufinus LC
Genus: Colomys African wading rat, Colomys goslingi LC
Genus: Dasymys West African shaggy rat, Dasymys rufulus LC
Genus: Grammomys Shining thicket rat, Grammomys rutilans LC
Genus: Heimyscus African smoky mouse, Heimyscus fumosus LC
Genus: Hybomys Eisentraut's striped mouse, Hybomys eisentrauti EN
 Peters's striped mouse, Hybomys univittatus LC
Genus: Hylomyscus Beaded wood mouse, Hylomyscus aeta LC
 Mount Oku hylomyscus, Hylomyscus grandis CR
 Little wood mouse, Hylomyscus parvus LC
 Stella wood mouse, Hylomyscus stella LC
Genus: Lamottemys Mount Oku rat, Lamottemys okuensis EN
Genus: Lemniscomys Mittendorf's striped grass mouse, Lemniscomys mittendorfi DD
 Typical striped grass mouse, Lemniscomys striatus LC
Genus: Malacomys Big-eared swamp rat, Malacomys longipes LC
Genus: Mastomys Guinea multimammate mouse, Mastomys erythroleucus LC
 Verheyen's multimammate mouse, Mastomys kollmannspergeri LC
 Natal multimammate mouse, Mastomys natalensis LC
Genus: Mus African pygmy mouse, Mus minutoides LC
 Peters's mouse, Mus setulosus LC
 Thomas's pygmy mouse, Mus sorella LC
Genus: Mylomys African groove-toothed rat, Mylomys dybowskii LC
Genus: Oenomys Common rufous-nosed rat, Oenomys hypoxanthus LC
Genus: Praomys Dalton's mouse, Praomys daltoni LC
 Hartwig's soft-furred mouse, Praomys hartwigi EN
 Jackson's soft-furred mouse, Praomys jacksoni LC
 Cameroon soft-furred mouse, Praomys morio VU
 Petter's soft-furred mouse, Praomys petteri LC
 Tullberg's soft-furred mouse, Praomys tullbergi LC
Genus: Stochomys Target rat, Stochomys longicaudatus LC

 Order: Lagomorpha (lagomorphs) 

The lagomorphs comprise two families, Leporidae (hares and rabbits), and Ochotonidae (pikas). Though they can resemble rodents, and were classified as a superfamily in that order until the early 20th century, they have since been considered a separate order. They differ from rodents in a number of physical characteristics, such as having four incisors in the upper jaw rather than two.

Family: Leporidae (rabbits, hares)
Genus: Lepus Cape hare, Lepus capensis LR/lc

 Order: Erinaceomorpha (hedgehogs and gymnures) 

The order Erinaceomorpha contains a single family, Erinaceidae, which comprise the hedgehogs and gymnures. The hedgehogs are easily recognised by their spines while gymnures look more like large rats.

Family: Erinaceidae (hedgehogs)
Subfamily: Erinaceinae
Genus: Atelerix Four-toed hedgehog, Atelerix albiventris LR/lc

 Order: Soricomorpha (shrews, moles, and solenodons) 

The "shrew-forms" are insectivorous mammals. The shrews and solenodons closely resemble mice while the moles are stout-bodied burrowers.

Family: Soricidae (shrews)
Subfamily: Crocidurinae
Genus: Crocidura Hun shrew, Crocidura attila LC
 Bates's shrew, Crocidura batesi LC
 Long-footed shrew, Crocidura crenata LC
 Crosse's shrew, Crocidura crossei LC
 Dent's shrew, Crocidura denti LC
 Long-tailed musk shrew, Crocidura dolichura LC
 Eisentraut's shrew, Crocidura eisentrauti VU
 Fox's shrew, Crocidura foxi LC
 Savanna shrew, Crocidura fulvastra LC
 Bicolored musk shrew, Crocidura fuscomurina LC
 Goliath shrew, Crocidura goliath LC
 Grasse's shrew, Crocidura grassei LC
 Hildegarde's shrew, Crocidura hildegardeae LC
 Lamotte's shrew, Crocidura lamottei LC
 Butiaba naked-tailed shrew, Crocidura littoralis LC
 Ludia's shrew, Crocidura ludia LC
 Manenguba shrew, Crocidura manengubae VU
 Nigerian shrew, Crocidura nigeriae LC
 African giant shrew, Crocidura olivieri LC
 Small-footed shrew, Crocidura parvipes LC
 Cameroonian shrew, Crocidura picea EN
 Fraser's musk shrew, Crocidura poensis LC
 Roosevelt's shrew, Crocidura roosevelti LC
 Turbo shrew, Crocidura turba LC
 Savanna path shrew, Crocidura viaria LC
 Voi shrew, Crocidura voi LC
 Yankari shrew, Crocidura yankariensis LC
Genus: Paracrocidura Lesser large-headed shrew, Paracrocidura schoutedeni LC
Genus: Suncus Least dwarf shrew, Suncus infinitesimus LC
 Remy's pygmy shrew, Suncus remyi LC
Genus: Sylvisorex Cameroonian forest shrew, Sylvisorex camerunensis EN
 Bioko forest shrew, Sylvisorex isabellae EN
 Johnston's forest shrew, Sylvisorex johnstoni LC
 Climbing shrew, Sylvisorex megalura LC
 Mount Cameroon forest shrew, Sylvisorex morio VU
 Greater forest shrew, Sylvisorex ollula LC
 Rain forest shrew, Sylvisorex pluvialis DD
Subfamily: Myosoricinae
Genus: Congosorex Lesser Congo shrew, Congosorex verheyeni LC
Genus: Myosorex Oku mouse shrew, Myosorex okuensis EN
 Rumpi mouse shrew, Myosorex rumpii CR

 Order: Chiroptera (bats) 

The bats' most distinguishing feature is that their forelimbs are developed as wings, making them the only mammals capable of flight. Bat species account for about 20% of all mammals.

Family: Pteropodidae (flying foxes, Old World fruit bats)
Subfamily: Pteropodinae
Genus: Casinycteris Short-palated fruit bat, Casinycteris argynnis NT
Genus: Eidolon Straw-coloured fruit bat, Eidolon helvum LC
Genus: Epomophorus Gambian epauletted fruit bat, Epomophorus gambianus LC
 Wahlberg's epauletted fruit bat, Epomophorus wahlbergi LC
Genus: Epomops Franquet's epauletted fruit bat, Epomops franqueti LC
Genus: Hypsignathus Hammer-headed bat, Hypsignathus monstrosus LC
Genus: Lissonycteris Angolan rousette, Lissonycteris angolensis LC
Genus: Micropteropus Peters's dwarf epauletted fruit bat, Micropteropus pusillus LC
Genus: Myonycteris Little collared fruit bat, Myonycteris torquata LC
Genus: Nanonycteris Veldkamp's dwarf epauletted fruit bat, Nanonycteris veldkampi LC
Genus: Rousettus Egyptian fruit bat, Rousettus aegyptiacus LC
Genus: Scotonycteris Pohle's fruit bat, Scotonycteris ophiodon EN
 Zenker's fruit bat, Scotonycteris zenkeri NT
Subfamily: Macroglossinae
Genus: Megaloglossus Woermann's bat, Megaloglossus woermanni LC
Family: Vespertilionidae
Subfamily: Kerivoulinae
Genus: Kerivoula Copper woolly bat, Kerivoula cuprosa NT
 Spurrell's woolly bat, Kerivoula phalaena NT
 Smith's woolly bat, Kerivoula smithi LC
Subfamily: Myotinae
Genus: Myotis Rufous mouse-eared bat, Myotis bocagii LC
Subfamily: Vespertilioninae
Genus: Glauconycteris Allen's striped bat, Glauconycteris alboguttata DD
 Silvered bat, Glauconycteris argentata LC
 Curry's bat, Glauconycteris curryae DD
 Bibundi bat, Glauconycteris egeria DD
 Glen's wattled bat, Glauconycteris gleni VU
 Abo bat, Glauconycteris poensis LC
 Butterfly bat, Glauconycteris variegata LC
Genus: Hypsugo Broad-headed pipistrelle, Hypsugo crassulus LC
 Eisentraut's pipistrelle, Hypsugo eisentrauti DD
 Mouselike pipistrelle, Hypsugo musciculus DD
Genus: Mimetillus Moloney's mimic bat, Mimetillus moloneyi LC
Genus: Neoromicia Dark-brown serotine, Neoromicia brunneus NT
 Cape serotine, Neoromicia capensis LC
 Yellow serotine, Neoromicia flavescens DD
 Tiny serotine, Neoromicia guineensis LC
 Banana pipistrelle, Neoromicia nanus LC
 Rendall's serotine, Neoromicia rendalli LC
 Somali serotine, Neoromicia somalicus LC
 White-winged serotine, Neoromicia tenuipinnis LC
Genus: Nycticeinops Schlieffen's bat, Nycticeinops schlieffeni LC
Genus: Pipistrellus Aellen's pipistrelle, Pipistrellus inexspectatus DD
 Tiny pipistrelle, Pipistrellus nanulus LC
 Least pipistrelle, Pipistrellus tenuis LR/lc
Genus: Scotoecus Hinde's lesser house bat, Scotoecus hindei DD
 Dark-winged lesser house bat, Scotoecus hirundo DD
Genus: Scotophilus African yellow bat, Scotophilus dinganii LC
 White-bellied yellow bat, Scotophilus leucogaster LC
 Nut-colored yellow bat, Scotophilus nux LC
 Greenish yellow bat, Scotophilus viridis LC
Subfamily: Miniopterinae
Genus: Miniopterus Greater long-fingered bat, Miniopterus inflatus LC
 Common bent-wing bat, Miniopterus schreibersii LC
Family: Rhinopomatidae
Genus: Rhinopoma Egyptian mouse-tailed bat, R. cystops 
Family: Molossidae
Genus: Chaerephon Duke of Abruzzi's free-tailed bat, Chaerephon aloysiisabaudiae NT
 Ansorge's free-tailed bat, Chaerephon ansorgei LC
 Gland-tailed free-tailed bat, Chaerephon bemmeleni LC
 Nigerian free-tailed bat, Chaerephon nigeriae LC
 Russet free-tailed bat, Chaerephon russata NT
Genus: Mops Sierra Leone free-tailed bat, Mops brachypterus LC
 Medje free-tailed bat, Mops congicus NT
 Mongalla free-tailed bat, Mops demonstrator NT
 Dwarf free-tailed bat, Mops nanulus LC
 Peterson's free-tailed bat, Mops petersoni VU
 Spurrell's free-tailed bat, Mops spurrelli LC
 Railer bat, Mops thersites LC
Genus: Myopterus Bini free-tailed bat, Myopterus whitleyi LC
Family: Emballonuridae
Genus: Saccolaimus Pel's pouched bat, Saccolaimus peli NT
Family: Nycteridae
Genus: Nycteris Bate's slit-faced bat, Nycteris arge LC
 Gambian slit-faced bat, Nycteris gambiensis LC
 Large slit-faced bat, Nycteris grandis LC
 Hairy slit-faced bat, Nycteris hispida LC
 Intermediate slit-faced bat, Nycteris intermedia NT
 Large-eared slit-faced bat, Nycteris macrotis LC
 Ja slit-faced bat, Nycteris major VU
 Dwarf slit-faced bat, Nycteris nana LC
 Parissi's slit-faced bat, Nycteris parisii DD
 Egyptian slit-faced bat, Nycteris thebaica LC
Family: Megadermatidae
Genus: Lavia Yellow-winged bat, Lavia frons LC
Family: Rhinolophidae
Subfamily: Rhinolophinae
Genus: Rhinolophus Halcyon horseshoe bat, Rhinolophus alcyone LC
 Rüppell's horseshoe bat, Rhinolophus fumigatus LC
 Hill's horseshoe bat, Rhinolophus hillorum VU
 Lander's horseshoe bat, Rhinolophus landeri LC
 Bushveld horseshoe bat, Rhinolophus simulator LC
Subfamily: Hipposiderinae
Genus: Hipposideros Aba roundleaf bat, Hipposideros abae NT
 Benito roundleaf bat, Hipposideros beatus LC
 Sundevall's roundleaf bat, Hipposideros caffer LC
 Greater roundleaf bat, Hipposideros camerunensis DD
 Short-tailed roundleaf bat, Hipposideros curtus VU
 Cyclops roundleaf bat, Hipposideros cyclops LC
 Sooty roundleaf bat, Hipposideros fuliginosus NT
 Giant roundleaf bat, Hipposideros gigas LC
 Noack's roundleaf bat, Hipposideros ruber LC

 Order: Pholidota (pangolins) 

The order Pholidota comprises the eight species of pangolin. Pangolins are anteaters and have the powerful claws, elongated snout and long tongue seen in the other unrelated anteater species.

Family: Manidae
Genus: Manis Giant pangolin, Manis gigantea LR/lc
 Long-tailed pangolin, Manis tetradactyla LR/lc
 Tree pangolin, Manis tricuspis LR/lc

 Order: Cetacea (whales) 

The order Cetacea includes whales, dolphins and porpoises. They are the mammals most fully adapted to aquatic life with a spindle-shaped nearly hairless body, protected by a thick layer of blubber, and forelimbs and tail modified to provide propulsion underwater.

Suborder: Mysticeti
Family: Balaenopteridae
Subfamily: Balaenopterinae
Genus: Balaenoptera Common minke whale, Balaenoptera acutorostrata LC
 Antarctic minke whale, Balaenoptera bonaerensis DD
 Sei whale, Balaenoptera borealis EN
 Bryde's whale, Balaenoptera edeni DD
 Blue whale, Balaenoptera musculus EN
 Fin whale, Balaenoptera physalus EN
Subfamily: Megapterinae
Genus: Megaptera Humpback whale, Megaptera novaeangliae VU
Suborder: Odontoceti
Superfamily: Platanistoidea
Family: Physeteridae
Genus: Physeter Sperm whale, Physeter macrocephalus VU
Family: Kogiidae
Genus: Kogia Pygmy sperm whale, Kogia breviceps LR/lc
 Dwarf sperm whale, Kogia sima LR/lc
Family: Ziphidae
Subfamily: Hyperoodontinae
Genus: Mesoplodon Blainville's beaked whale, Mesoplodon densirostris DD
 Gervais' beaked whale, Mesoplodon europaeus DD
Genus: Ziphius Cuvier's beaked whale, Ziphius cavirostris DD
Family: Delphinidae (marine dolphins)
Genus: Steno Rough-toothed dolphin, Steno bredanensis DD
Genus: Tursiops Common bottlenose dolphin, Tursiops truncatus LC
Genus: Delphinus Long-beaked common dolphin, Delphinus capensis DD
Genus: Stenella Pantropical spotted dolphin, Stenella attenuata LR/cd
 Striped dolphin, Stenella coeruleoalba LR/cd
 Atlantic spotted dolphin, Stenella frontalis DD
 Clymene dolphin, Stenella clymene DD
 Spinner dolphin, Stenella longirostris LR/cd
Genus: Lagenodelphis Fraser's dolphin, Lagenodelphis hosei DD
Genus: Sousa Atlantic humpback dolphin, Sousa teusziiGenus: Orcinus Orca, Orcinus orca LR/cd
Genus: Feresa Pygmy killer whale, Feresa attenuata DD
Genus: Pseudorca False killer whale, Pseudorca crassidens LR/lc
Genus: Globicephala Short-finned pilot whale, Globicephala macrorhynchus LR/cd
Genus: Peponocephala Melon-headed whale, Peponocephala electra DD

 Order: Carnivora (carnivorans) 

There are over 260 species of carnivorans, the majority of which feed primarily on meat. They have a characteristic skull shape and dentition.
Suborder: Feliformia
Family: Felidae (cats)
Subfamily: Felinae
Genus: CaracalAfrican golden cat, C. aurata 
Caracal, C. caracal 
Genus: LeptailurusServal, L. serval 
Subfamily: Pantherinae
Genus: Panthera Lion, P. leo 
Leopard, P. pardus 
Family: Viverridae
Subfamily: Viverrinae
Genus: CivettictisAfrican civet, C. civetta 
Genus: GenettaCrested servaline genet, G. cristata 
Common genet, G. genetta 
 Rusty-spotted genet, Genetta maculata LC
 Servaline genet, Genetta servalina LC
 Hausa genet, Genetta thierryi LC
Genus: PoianaCentral African oyan, P. richardsonii 
Family: Nandiniidae
Genus: Nandinia African palm civet, Nandinia binotata LC
Family: Herpestidae (mongooses)
Genus: Atilax Marsh mongoose, Atilax paludinosus LC
Genus: Bdeogale Black-footed mongoose, Bdeogale nigripes LC
Genus: Crossarchus Flat-headed kusimanse, Crossarchus platycephalus LC
Genus: HerpestesEgyptian mongoose, Herpestes ichneumon 
Common slender mongoose, Herpestes sanguineus LC
Genus: Mungos Banded mongoose, Mungos mungo LC
Genus: XenogaleLong-nosed mongoose, Xenogale naso LC
Family: Hyaenidae (hyaenas)
Genus: Crocuta Spotted hyena, Crocuta crocuta LC
Genus: HyaenaStriped hyena, H. hyaena 
Suborder: Caniformia
Family: Canidae (dogs, foxes)
Genus: CanisAfrican golden wolf, C. lupaster 
Genus: Lupulella Side-striped jackal, L. adusta  
Genus: Lycaon African wild dog, L. pictus  extirpated
Genus: Vulpes Pale fox, V. pallida LC
Family: Mustelidae (mustelids)
Genus: Ictonyx Striped polecat, Ictonyx striatus LC
Genus: MellivoraHoney badger, M. capensis 
Genus: Hydrictis Speckle-throated otter, Hydrictis maculicollis LC
Genus: Aonyx African clawless otter, Aonyx capensis LC

 Order: Perissodactyla (odd-toed ungulates) 

The odd-toed ungulates are browsing and grazing mammals. They are usually large to very large, and have relatively simple stomachs and a large middle toe.

Family: Rhinocerotidae
Genus: Diceros Western black rhinoceros, Diceros bicornis longipes EX

 Order: Artiodactyla (even-toed ungulates) 

The even-toed ungulates are ungulates whose weight is borne about equally by the third and fourth toes, rather than mostly or entirely by the third as in perissodactyls. There are about 220 artiodactyl species, including many that are of great economic importance to humans.

Family: Suidae (pigs)
Subfamily: Phacochoerinae
Genus: Phacochoerus Common warthog, Phacochoerus africanus LR/lc
Subfamily: Suinae
Genus: Hylochoerus
 Giant forest hog, Hylochoerus meinertzhageni LR/lc
Genus: Potamochoerus
 Red river hog, Potamochoerus porcus LR/lc
Family: Hippopotamidae (hippopotamuses)
Genus: Hippopotamus
 Hippopotamus, Hippopotamus amphibius VU
Family: Tragulidae
Genus: Hyemoschus
 Water chevrotain, Hyemoschus aquaticus DD
Family: Giraffidae (giraffe, okapi)
Genus: Giraffa
 West African giraffe, Giraffa camelopardalis peralta EN
Family: Bovidae (cattle, antelope, sheep, goats)
Subfamily: Alcelaphinae
Genus: Alcelaphus
 Hartebeest, Alcelaphus buselaphus LR/cd
Genus: Damaliscus
 Topi, Damaliscus lunatus LR/cd
Subfamily: Antilopinae
Genus: Gazella
 Dama gazelle, Gazella dama CR
 Red-fronted gazelle, Gazella rufifrons VU
Genus: Neotragus
 Bates's pygmy antelope, Neotragus batesi LR/nt
Genus: Ourebia
 Oribi, Ourebia ourebi LR/cd
Subfamily: Bovinae
Genus: Syncerus
 African buffalo, Syncerus caffer LR/cd
Genus: Tragelaphus
 Giant eland, Tragelaphus derbianus LR/nt
 Bongo, Tragelaphus eurycerus LR/nt
 Bushbuck, Tragelaphus scriptus LR/lc
 Sitatunga, Tragelaphus spekii LR/nt
Subfamily: Cephalophinae
Genus: Cephalophus
 Peters's duiker, Cephalophus callipygus LR/nt
 Bay duiker, Cephalophus dorsalis LR/nt
 White-bellied duiker, Cephalophus leucogaster LR/nt
 Blue duiker, Cephalophus monticola LR/lc
 Black-fronted duiker, Cephalophus nigrifrons LR/nt
 Ogilby's duiker, Cephalophus ogilbyi LR/nt
 Red-flanked duiker, Cephalophus rufilatus LR/cd
 Yellow-backed duiker, Cephalophus silvicultor LR/nt
Genus: Sylvicapra
 Common duiker, Sylvicapra grimmia LR/lc
Subfamily: Hippotraginae
Genus: Hippotragus
 Roan antelope, Hippotragus equinus LR/cd
Subfamily: Reduncinae
Genus: Kobus
 Waterbuck, Kobus ellipsiprymnus LR/cd
 Kob, Kobus kob LR/cd
Genus: Redunca
 Mountain reedbuck, Redunca fulvorufula LC
 Bohor reedbuck, Redunca redunca LR/cd

See also
List of chordate orders
Lists of mammals by region
List of prehistoric mammals
Mammal classification
List of mammals described in the 2000s

References

External links

Mammals

Cameroon
Cameroon